Raffles Island is an uninhabited island located approximately 4 km to east of the Sparrebugt bay, Liverpool Land, about 20 km north-east of the town of Ittoqqortoormiit, Greenland in the Scoresby Sund area.

Description
It was named by William Scoresby Jr. in 1822 as Raffles Island in honour of Reverend Thomas Raffles (1788–1863), a prominent independent minister. 
The alternative native Greenlandic names of Agpalik or Appalik are also in use. It is also known with the Danish names of Raffle Ø or Raffles Ø.

The highest point of the island lies at 550m above the sea level. The island hosts a little lake, called Raffles Sø.
Its mean temperature is almost always close to 0 degrees Celsius.
Gull colonies have been recorded on the island.

See also
List of islands of Greenland

References

Uninhabited islands of Greenland